An opiate is any of the narcotic alkaloids found in opium.

Opiate may also refer to:

 Opiate, an alias of Danish musician and producer Thomas Knak
 Opiate (EP), an EP and title track by progressive rock band Tool
 "Opiate" (song), a song by the rock band Tool

See also
  "Opiated", a song by The Tragically Hip from the album Up to Here
 List of opioids
 Opioid epidemic